Chahnez Al-M'barki (also Chahnez M'barki, ; born 12 June 1981) is a Tunisian judoka, who played for the extra-lightweight category. She is a six-time medalist at the African Judo Championships, and a bronze medalist at the 2007 All-Africa Games in Algiers, Algeria. She also won a silver medal for her division at the 2009 Mediterranean Games in Pescara, Italy, losing out to the host nation's Elena Moretti.

M'barki represented Tunisia at the 2008 Summer Olympics in Beijing, where she competed for the women's extra-lightweight class (48 kg). Unfortunately, she lost the first preliminary round match, by a waza-ari awasete ippon (two full points), and a morote gari (two hand reap), to Ukraine's Lyudmyla Lusnikova.

References

External links
 
 

 NBC Olympics Profile

Tunisian female judoka
Living people
Olympic judoka of Tunisia
Judoka at the 2008 Summer Olympics
1981 births
Mediterranean Games silver medalists for Tunisia
Competitors at the 2009 Mediterranean Games
African Games bronze medalists for Tunisia
African Games medalists in judo
Mediterranean Games medalists in judo
Competitors at the 2007 All-Africa Games
21st-century Tunisian women
20th-century Tunisian women